Maciej Sadlok (born 29 June 1989 in Oświęcim) is a Polish professional footballer who plays for Ruch Chorzów as a defender.

Career

Club
Sadlok began his career in 2005 with Pasjonat Dankowice. In January 2007 he joined Ruch Chorzów, making his Ekstraklasa debut on 27 July 2007.

On 31 August 2010, it was announced that Sadlok would become a Polonia Warsaw player in February 2011.

International
He featured for the Poland national under-21 team. In November 2009, Sadlok made his first appearance for the senior team as a late sub against Romania, following that up with a full 90 minutes against Canada.

On 14 November 2016, Sadlok was subbed on in the 83rd minute against Slovenia in a 1–1 draw.

Career statistics

Club

International

References

External links
 

1989 births
Living people
People from Oświęcim
Polish footballers
Poland international footballers
Poland under-21 international footballers
Ruch Chorzów players
Polonia Warsaw players
Wisła Kraków players
Ekstraklasa players
Sportspeople from Lesser Poland Voivodeship
Association football defenders